Prioria is a genus of flowering plants in the family Fabaceae. Members of this genus are found in Central America, Africa, southern Asia, and Oceania.

Species
Prioria comprises the following species

African species
 Prioria balsamifera (Vermoesen) Breteler
 Prioria buchholzii (Harms) Breteler
 Prioria gilbertii (J. Léonard) Breteler
 Prioria joveri (Normand ex Aubrév.) Breteler
 Prioria mannii (Baill.) Breteler
 Prioria msoo (Harms) Breteler
 Prioria oxyphylla (Harms) Breteler

American species
 Prioria copaifera Griseb.
† Prioria martineziorum Rodriguez-Reyes & Estrada-Ruiz

Asiatic and Pacific species
 Prioria alternifolia (Elm.) Breteler
 Prioria micrantha (Burtt) Breteler
 Prioria novoguineensis (Verde.) Breteler
 Prioria pinnata (Roxb. ex DC.) Breteler
 Prioria platycarpa (Burtt) Breteler
 Prioria tenuicarpa (Verde.) Breteler

References

Detarioideae
Fabaceae genera